Peucephyllum is a monotypic genus of flowering plants containing the single species Peucephyllum schottii. Its common names include pygmy cedar, Schott's pygmy cedar, desert fir, and desert pine. It is not a cedar, fir, or pine, but a member of the aster family, Asteraceae. It is a leafy evergreen shrub with glandular, resinous foliage. It flowers in yellow flower heads which have only disc florets. The fruits are woody, bristly seeds with a pappus. This plant is native to the deserts of Arizona, California, Nevada, and Utah in the United States and Baja California and Sonora in northern Mexico.

The species form is similar to that of the common creosote bush (Larrea tridentata): small, greenish, and hemispherical with similar yellow flowers in the spring.

References

External links

Calflora Database: Peucephyllum schottii (Desert fir, Pigmycedar, Schott's pygmycedar, desert pine)
Peucephyllum schottii — U.C. Photo gallery

Monotypic Asteraceae genera
Bahieae
Flora of the California desert regions
Flora of the Sonoran Deserts
Flora of Arizona
Flora of Baja California
Flora of Nevada
Flora of Sonora
Flora of Utah
Natural history of the Colorado Desert
Natural history of the Mojave Desert